René Mangold (born 7 December 1963) is a Swiss track and field athlete and bobsledder.

Track and field 

Active since 1972, Mangold's peak performances came in 1988, when he became Swiss champion in the 100 metre and 200 metre sprint competitions and finished second in the long jump competition. He won the 100m competition with a time of 10.58sec, and the 200 metres in 21.46sec.

Bobsleigh 

He won a silver medal in the four-man event at the 1989 FIBT World Championships in Cortina d'Ampezzo.

References

Living people
Swiss male sprinters
Swiss male long jumpers
Swiss male bobsledders
1963 births